Kazimierz Ludwik Bieliński (?-1713) was a Polish noble, politician and diplomat. He held several prominent offices in the Polish–Lithuanian Commonwealth. He was the starost of several counties. He obtained the central office of Crown Court Chamberlain from 1688 to 1702. Court Crown Marshal in 1702 and soon afterward he became the Grand Crown Marshal (1702-1713). He was a deputy to numerous Sejms (1683, 1688, 1690, marshal of the Sejm in 1697). He had a large court at the Palace in Otwock Wielki. He was a member of the Sandomierz Confederation. 
Recipient of the Order of the White Eagle.

Son of Jan Franciszek Bieliński. In 1682 he married Ludwika Maria Morsztyn. Father of Franciszek Bieliński (b. 1683), Marianna Denhoff (b.1685, lover of August II of Poland), and others.

References
 Kazimierz Piwarski: Bieliński Kazimierz Ludwik. In: Polski Słownik Biograficzny. T. 2: Beyzym Jan – Brownsford Marja. Kraków: Polska Akademia Umiejętności – Skład Główny w Księgarniach Gebethnera i Wolffa, 1936, s. 53–55. Reprint: Zakład Narodowy im. Ossolińskich, Kraków 1989, 

17th-century births
1713 deaths
Polish diplomats
17th-century Polish nobility
Secular senators of the Polish–Lithuanian Commonwealth
Marshals of the Sejm of the Polish–Lithuanian Commonwealth
Recipients of the Order of the White Eagle (Poland)
18th-century Polish nobility